The 8th Asian Games were held from 9 to 20 December  1978, in Bangkok, Thailand. Originally, the host city was Singapore but Singapore dropped its plan to host the Games due to financial problems. Then Islamabad, the capital of Pakistan, was decided to host the 8th Games.  But Islamabad also dropped its plan to host the Asian Games due to conflicts with Bangladesh and India.

Thailand offered to help and the Asiad therefore was held in Bangkok. On the political front, Israel was expelled from the Asian Games. A total number of 3,842 athletes, coming from 25 countries, competed in these Asian Games. Debuting sports were archery and bowling.

Sports

Participating nations
25 out of 32 Olympic Council of Asia members participated in these games. Iran just sent only one official and did not participate in the games due to the political situation in Iran at the time.

Medal table

The top ten ranked NOCs at these Games are listed below. The host nation, Thailand, is highlighted.

References

External links
 www.ocasia.org

 
Asian Games
Asian Games
Asian Games
Asian Games
Summer
Asian Games by year
Asian Games